Linwood is an unincorporated community in Linwood Township, Anoka County, Minnesota, United States.

Anoka County Road 22 serves as a main route in the community.

References

Unincorporated communities in Anoka County, Minnesota
Unincorporated communities in Minnesota